V1 Gallery is a contemporary art gallery located in the Meatpacking District of Copenhagen, Denmark. It was founded in 2002 by designer Jesper Elg and photographer Peter Funch. V1 Gallery gained international notability by being the first art gallery in Scandinavia to exhibit international street art pioneers such as Banksy (UK) and Eine (UK), the Faile artist collective (US/JAP), Futura 2000 (US), Zevs (FR) and OBEY / Shepard Fairey (US). The gallery has been listed as "Copenhagen's coolest art gallery" by The New York Times, and listed in ArtNet's "Best contemporary galleries in Europe".

The gallery's best known projects include:

The Boredom Project by Faile in 2002
Banksy VS EINE by Banksy and EINE in 2003
The Hunt For Your Family featuring artists such as Devendra Banhart, Adam Green (musician), and Chris Johanson curated by Galleri Loyal in 2004
OBEY by Shepard Fairey in 2004
Futura - Year In Pictures by Futura 2000 in 2005
Random Happenings with Dash Snow in 2005
Coup de Theatre by Jakob Boeskov in 2005
MuhameDansk by HuskMitNavn in 2006
Highmath curated by Arkitip in 2006
V-B by Dearraindrop in 2006
Super Fortress by Richard Colman in 2006
Rehearsal For Death by Neck Face in 2007
Trouble by Todd REAS James in 2007
Babel Tales by Peter Funch in 2007

External links
Gallery Website

References

Vesterbro, Copenhagen
Art museums and galleries in Copenhagen
Art galleries established in 2002
2002 establishments in Denmark